Minuscule 376 (in the Gregory-Aland numbering), ε 100 (Soden), is a Greek minuscule manuscript of the New Testament, on parchment. Paleographically it has been assigned to the 11th century. 
It has marginalia.

Description 

The codex contains the text of the four Gospels on 185 parchment leaves. The text is written in one column per page, in 28 lines per page. The text of Luke 1:42-71 and two leaves in Mark were supplied by a later hand.

There is also a division according to the smaller Ammonian Sections (in Mark 241 Sections, the last in 16:21; also in subscription 241).

Text of Matthew 16:2b–3 (signs of the times) is omitted, text of Pericope Adulterae (John 7:53-8:11) is marked by an obelus.

Text 

The Greek text of the codex is a representative of the Byzantine text-type. Aland placed it in Category V.

According to the Claremont Profile Method it belongs to the textual family Kx in Luke 1 (partly illegible), Luke 10, and Luke 20. It belongs to the textual cluster 183.

History 

The manuscript was given by Francis Accidas in 1585 to Pope Sixtus V. The manuscript was added to the list of New Testament manuscripts by Scholz (1794-1852).
C. R. Gregory saw it in 1886.

The manuscript is currently housed at the Vatican Library (Vat. gr. 1539) in Rome.

See also 

 List of New Testament minuscules
 Biblical manuscript
 Textual criticism

References

Further reading 

 

Greek New Testament minuscules
11th-century biblical manuscripts
Manuscripts of the Vatican Library